Gong Zheng (born 4 March 1960) is a Chinese politician who serves as Mayor and Deputy Communist Party Secretary of Shanghai Municipality. He was formerly Governor of Shandong Province, the Party Secretary of Hangzhou, the capital of Zhejiang province, and before that, Vice Governor and Executive Vice Governor of Zhejiang, and deputy director of the General Administration of Customs. He graduated from the University of International Business and Economics (UIBE).

Life and career
Gong Zheng was born in March 1960 in Suzhou, Jiangsu province. He graduated from Beijing Institute of Foreign Trade (later renamed University of International Business and Economics, UIBE) in 1982, and worked for the Chinese General Administration of Customs after graduation. He later furthered his studies at the School of Taxation of Golden Gate University in 1987 in the United States, and returned to UIBE, earning an MBA in 1997. He also enrolled at Xiamen University from 2001 to 2004, obtaining a Ph.D. in Economics.

Gong served as deputy director of the Tianjin customs department from 1993 to 1996, and director of the Shenzhen customs department from 2001 to 2003. In 2003, he was promoted to Deputy Director of the General Administration of Customs.

In December 2008, Gong Zheng was appointed Vice Governor of Zhejiang province, and was promoted to Executive Vice Governor in June 2012. In September 2013, he became the Communist Party Chief of Hangzhou, the provincial capital. In August 2015, Gong was named deputy party chief of Shandong province, replacing Wang Junmin, who left the post due to reaching the mandatory retirement age.

In April 2017, Gong was appointed as Governor of Shandong.

On March 23, 2020, Gong was appointed as Mayor of Shanghai.

A Hangzhou official described Gong as an "open-minded" leader who spoke English reasonably well.

References

Living people
1960 births
Mayors of Shanghai
Governors of Shandong
Chinese Communist Party politicians from Jiangsu
People's Republic of China politicians from Jiangsu
Members of the 20th Central Committee of the Chinese Communist Party
Members of the 19th Central Committee of the Chinese Communist Party
Political office-holders in Zhejiang
Politicians from Suzhou
Beijing University of International Business and Economics alumni
Golden Gate University alumni
Xiamen University alumni